What Rats Won't Do is a 1998 British comedy film directed by Alastair Reid and starring James Frain and Natascha McElhone.

Plot 
Kate Beckenham is hired by American heiress Mirella Burton to defend Burton's claim to the £15million estate of her deceased husband against his son Gerald. Gerald has hired lawyer Jack Sullivan, who has never lost a case in court. Though Beckenham is engaged, she finds herself attracted to Sullivan.

Cast 
 James Frain - Jack Sullivan
 Natascha McElhone - Kate Beckenham
 Amy Phillips - Ellen
 Valentine Pelka - Graham
 Samantha Bond - Jane
 Freddie Jones - Judge Foster
 Chris Jury - Defendant
 Peter Capaldi - Tony
 W. Stephen Gilbert - Foster's Clerk
 Harry Enfield - Verger

References

External links 

1998 comedy films
1998 films
British comedy films
1990s English-language films
Films directed by Alastair Reid
1990s British films